Imran Yousuf (born 23 December 1978) is a Pakistani field hockey player. He competed in the men's tournament at the 2000 Summer Olympics.

References

External links
 

1978 births
Living people
Pakistani male field hockey players
Olympic field hockey players of Pakistan
Field hockey players at the 2000 Summer Olympics
Place of birth missing (living people)
Asian Games medalists in field hockey
Asian Games bronze medalists for Pakistan
Medalists at the 1998 Asian Games
Field hockey players at the 1998 Asian Games
1998 Men's Hockey World Cup players
20th-century Pakistani people